Charmaine L. Howell (born 13 March 1975 in Trelawny Parish) is a retired Jamaican athlete who specialized in the 800 metres.

Career

She competed at the 2000 Olympics, being knocked out in the semi final. She also ran for the Jamaican 4 x 400 metres relay team in the heats and could therefore receive an Olympic silver medal after Lorraine Graham, Deon Hemmings, Sandie Richards and Catherine Scott-Pomales finished second in the final.

Her personal best time over 800 metres was 1:59.61 minutes, achieved in June 2001 in Portland.

Since retiring, Charmaine has become a Financial Counselor and Zumba Instructor.

Achievements

External links

Picture of Charmain Howell (JAM:13) right

Picture of Charmaine Howell

References

1975 births
Living people
People from Trelawny Parish
Jamaican female middle-distance runners
Jamaican female sprinters
Athletes (track and field) at the 2000 Summer Olympics
Olympic athletes of Jamaica
Olympic silver medalists for Jamaica
South Carolina Gamecocks women's track and field athletes
Pan American Games competitors for Jamaica
Athletes (track and field) at the 1999 Pan American Games
Medalists at the 2000 Summer Olympics
Olympic silver medalists in athletics (track and field)
Goodwill Games medalists in athletics
World Athletics Indoor Championships medalists
Competitors at the 1998 Goodwill Games
Athletes (track and field) at the 2002 Commonwealth Games
Commonwealth Games competitors for Jamaica
Olympic female sprinters